Mhasala Taluka is a taluka in the Raigad district of Maharashtra an Indian state.  Its villages are Banoti, Kharasai, Revali, Tondsure, Agarwada, Pedambe, Saklap, Jangamvadi, Varavathane, and Ganeshnagar.

Raigad district
As of August 2015, there were 8 sub-divisions, 15 talukas, 1970 villages, 60 revenue circles and 350 sazzas in the Raigad district. The talukas are Alibag, Karjat, Khalapur, Mahad, Mangaon, Mhasala, Murud, Panvel, Pen, Poladpur, Roha, Shrivardhan, Sudhagad Pali, Tala and Uran.

References

Talukas in Maharashtra
Talukas in Raigad district